It's all Love! is a collaboration single by Japanese singer-songwriters Koda Kumi and misono. The single was originally set to be released on March 4, but was pushed back to its official release date of March 31, 2009.

The single charted at No. 1 on Oricon, making it Kumi's third consecutive number-one single and misono's first number-one single. It stayed on the charts for eleven weeks.

Information
It's all Love! is a collaboration single between Japanese sisters Koda Kumi and misono. It charted No. 1 on the Oricon Singles Charts charts, becoming Kumi's third consecutive number-one single (seventh overall) and misono's first number-one single. It remained on the charts for eleven weeks.

It's all Love! became the first time a sibling collaborative effort charted since 1980's Dancing Sisters album by The Nolans.

The single had been long-awaited by Japanese fans, due to both Koda sisters being musicians under the same label, Avex, despite having differing musical styles. Kumi released music predominantly under the R&B and pop musical genres, while misono released music predominantly under the rock genre.

It was released as a standard CD, a CD+DVD combo and a limited edition fan club edition. At some local Tower Records stores, the single was paired with a poster as a first-come, first-served promotion.

Along with the sisters' collaboration song, there were two other songs on the single, each performed solo by each sister. "faarway" was performed by Koda Kumi and "Tenbin ~Tsuyogari na Watashi x Yowagari na Kimi~" (天秤~強がりな私×弱がりな君~ / Balance ~Strong Me x Weak You~) was performed by misono. However, only "faraway" contained a corresponding music video. misono had previously released the music video for "Tenbin ~Tsuyogari na Watashi x Yowagari na Kimi~" on her single Kyukon ~Yaruki•Genki•Sono Ki no Nekko~/?cm, although the song was not included on the CD.

Despite "It's all Love!" being a shared song, it was not placed on misono's corresponding album Me.

The single was certified Gold for shipment of 100,000 copies, and "It's all Love!" was certified platinum for full-length cellphone downloads.

Packaging
It's all Love! was released in three editions: a standard CD, a CD+DVD combo and a limited fan club edition. The CD for the standard and combination editions featured the title track, the coupling tracks "faraway" and "Tenbin ~Tsuyogari na Watashi x Yowagari na Kimi~", along with the corresponding instrumentals for each song. The DVD housed music videos for "It's all Love!" and "faraway", along with the behind-the-scenes making video of "faraway".

The fan club edition carried the collaborative track and its instrumental, along with differing cover art.

Promotional Advertisements
"It's all Love!" was used as the ending theme to Nippon TV's Sukkiri!! (スッキリ!! / Refreshed!!).

"faraway" was used as the theme for the film Subaru (昴), to which fellow label-mates TVXQ (Tohoshinki) performed the song "Bolero" in the film's bar scene. The movie is named after the ballerina lead named Subaru. It was released on March 20, 2009.

Live performances
 03/27: Music Station Haru Special – It's all Love!, faraway
 06/04: Live Tour 2009 ~Trick~- It's all Love!

Track list

Standard Edition

Playroom Edition

Charts

Oricon Sales Chart (Japan)

Various charts

References

External links
Kumi Koda's official website
Misono's official website 
Kumi Koda and Misono special website

2009 singles
2009 songs
Billboard Japan Hot 100 number-one singles
Koda Kumi songs
Misono songs
Oricon Weekly number-one singles
Rhythm Zone singles
RIAJ Digital Track Chart number-one singles
Songs written by Misono
Songs written by Kenichi Maeyamada
Songs written by Koda Kumi
Female vocal duets